The American Basketball Association (ABA)  was a professional basketball league founded in 1967.  The ABA ceased to exist after merging with the National Basketball Association (NBA) in 1976. In total, the league held nine all-star games, with all but the last being between the Western Division and the Eastern Division. In the final one, it was held between the first place team at the time of the All-Star break face off against a selected group of All-Stars, regardless of conference.

See also
List of American Basketball Association awards and honors

References

American Basketball Association
Basketball all-star games
Recurring sporting events established in 1968
Recurring sporting events disestablished in 1976
1968 establishments in the United States
1976 disestablishments in the United States